Sir Abel Barker, 1st Baronet (c.1616 – 1679) was an English politician.

Biography
Barker was the son of Abel Barker and Elizabeth Wright. In 1637 he inherited the manor of Hambleton, Rutland, from his father and he prospered as a large-scale sheep-farmer. During the English Civil War, Barker supported Parliament and he served on the Rutland county committee. In 1646 he was appointed High Sheriff of Rutland and he served as a justice of the peace for the county between 1647 and 1653. In 1656, he was elected as a Member of Parliament for Rutland in the Second Protectorate Parliament, representing the seat until 1658. In 1659 he served as commissioner for militia in Rutland.

Barker supported the Stuart Restoration in 1660 and was a signatory of the loyal address to Charles II of England. He was proposed as a Knight of the Royal Oak in 1660 with an estate of £1,000 per year. In 1661 he stood unsuccessfully against Edward Noel for re-election to parliament. His success as a farmer and landlord enabled him to construct a manor at Lyndon, Rutland and purchase a baronetcy; on the 9 September 1665 he was made a baronet, of Hambleton in the Baronetage of England. In 1679, he was again returned as the member for Rutland, but died before the Second Exclusion Parliament convened.

He was married twice, and was succeeded in his baronetcy by his son from his first marriage, Thomas. The title became extinct on the death of the second baronet in 1707.

References

Year of birth uncertain
1679 deaths
Baronets in the Baronetage of England
English MPs 1656–1658
High Sheriffs of Rutland
Roundheads